Belantamab mafodotin, sold under the brand name Blenrep, is a medication for the treatment of relapsed and refractory multiple myeloma.

The most common adverse reactions include keratopathy (corneal epithelium change on eye exam), decreased visual acuity, nausea, blurred vision, pyrexia, infusion-related reactions, and fatigue.

Belantamab mafodotin is a humanized IgG1κ monoclonal antibody against the B-cell maturation antigen (BCMA) conjugated with a cytotoxic agent, maleimidocaproyl monomethyl auristatin F (mcMMAF). The antibody-drug conjugate binds to BCMA on myeloma cell surfaces causing cell cycle arrest and inducing antibody-dependent cellular cytotoxicity.

Belantamab mafodotin was approved for medical use in the United States and in the European Union in August 2020. The U.S. Food and Drug Administration (FDA) considers it to be a first-in-class medication. 

On November 22, 2022, GSK plc announced it initiated the process for withdrawal of the United States marketing authorization for belantamab mafodotin following the request of the U.S. FDA. This request was based on the outcome of the DREAMM-3 phase III confirmatory trial,  which did not meet the requirements of the U.S. FDA Accelerated Approval regulations.

Medical uses 
Belantamab mafodotin is indicated for the treatment of adults with relapsed or refractory multiple myeloma who have received at least four prior therapies including an anti-CD38 monoclonal antibody, a proteasome inhibitor, and an immunomodulatory agent.

Adverse effects 
The prescribing information includes a boxed warning stating belantamab mafodotin causes changes in the corneal epithelium resulting in alterations in vision, including severe vision loss and corneal ulcer, and symptoms, such as blurred vision and dry eyes.

Because of the risks of ocular toxicity, belantamab mafodotin is only available through a restricted program under a Risk Evaluation and Mitigation Strategy (REMS), called the BLENREP REMS.

History 
Belantamab mafodotin was evaluated in DREAMM-2 (NCT 03525678), an open-label, multicenter trial. Participants received either belantamab mafodotin, 2.5 mg/kg or 3.4 mg/kg intravenously, once every three weeks until disease progression or unacceptable toxicity.

Efficacy was based on overall response rate (ORR) and response duration, as evaluated by an independent review committee using the International Myeloma Working Group uniform response criteria.  The ORR was 31% (97.5% CI: 21%, 43%). Seventy-three percent of responders had response durations ≥6 months. These results were observed in participants receiving the recommended dose of 2.5 mg/kg.

The U.S. Food and Drug Administration (FDA) granted the application for belantamab mafodotin priority review, orphan drug designation, and breakthrough therapy designation.

Society and culture

Legal status 
Belantamab mafodotin was approved for medical use in the United States and in the European Union in August 2020.

Names 
Belantamab mafodotin is the international nonproprietary name (INN).

References

Further reading

External links 
 
 
 

Breakthrough therapy
GSK plc brands
Monoclonal antibodies for tumors
Orphan drugs
Antibody-drug conjugates